Pound Green is a hamlet in Upper Arley, Worcestershire, England. It has a number of tourist landmarks such as Ye Olde New Inn and a village hall that also serves Button Oak village.

Pound Green Common is an area of common land, west of the village  which was the location of Edgar Chance's studies of the common cuckoo (Cuculus canorus) which included the first ever photography of a cuckoo laying her egg.

References

Villages in Worcestershire